Jacquetta Jean Frederica Eliot, Countess of St. Germans (born 1943) is the third daughter of Miles Wedderburn Lampson, 1st Baron Killearn. She is his first daughter by his second marriage, to Jacqueline Aldine Leslie (née Castellani), daughter of Marchese Senator Aldo Castellani.

Family and early life
On 9 October 1964 she married Peregrine Nicholas Eliot, 10th Earl of Saint Germans. The marriage lasted 26 years, ending in divorce in 1990. Three children were born during that marriage:

 Jago Nicholas Aldo Eliot, Lord Eliot (b. 24 Mar 1966) died on 16 Apr 2006, leaving an infant son, Albert Clarence Eliot, heir to his grandfather's titles
 Hon Louis Robert Eliot (b. 11 April 1968)
 Hon Francis Michael Eliot (b. 16 November 1971). It was later revealed that the noted painter Lucian Freud was his biological father.

Career
In 1967, she played the role of Jacquetta in the film Echoes of Silence, written and directed by Peter Emanuel Goldman.

Jacquetta was a socialite and noted beauty and sat for various artists and photographers including Horst P. Horst, who featured her in Vogue's Book of Houses, Gardens and People, and Richard Avedon.

Between 1969 and 1978 she sat for Freud and featured in nine of his paintings, including the 1973 work Large Interior W9 and several drawings. In 2006 she modelled for Mario Testino in a Burberry advertisement.

She was a founder member/director of the Elephant Fayre 1981–1986. She has been featured in various documentaries about the life and art of Lucian Freud.

References

External links
 Echoes of Silence at the Internet Movie Database

Living people
British countesses
British actresses
British female models
British artists' models
British people of Italian descent
Daughters of barons
1943 births